Sherry Yard (born January 11, 1964) is an American chef, restaurateur and cookbook author.

Career
Yard has served as a chef in several Wolfgang Puck restaurants, including Spago, Rainbow Room and Tribeca Grill. She also served as chief operating officer, Restaurant Division at iPic Entertainment, a national entertainment group known for their upscale movie theaters, in-cinema dining, and restaurants. She officially stepped down from iPic in July 2019.

Yard has stated that her signature dessert is Kaiserschmarrn.

Television
Yard has served as a judge on several cooking shows, including the Food Network series Halloween Baking Championship, Cake Wars Christmas, Christmas Cookie Challenge, Cooking Channel television series Sugar Showdown and more recently on ABC's The Great American Baking Show. She has been a guest judge on Top Chef: Just Desserts, Food Network Star, Duff Till Dawn, Iron Chef America and Cutthroat Kitchen. She has also competed in the Food Network show, Cutthroat Kitchen: Superstar Sabotage.

Personal life

On May 3, 2008, Yard married dentist Edward M. Ines in Malibu, California in a destination wedding hosted by Wolfgang Puck, whom Yard served under as the corporate executive pastry chef at the time. They live in Manhattan Beach, California.

Bibliography

Awards and nominations

References

External links
 
 

1964 births
American cookbook writers
American women restaurateurs
American television chefs
Businesspeople from New York City
Culinary Institute of America alumni
Food Network chefs
James Beard Foundation Award winners
Living people
Pastry chefs
People from Sheepshead Bay, Brooklyn
American women chefs
Women cookbook writers
21st-century American women